Watagoda is a small town in the Nuwara Eliya District, Central Province, Sri Lanka.

Watagoda is administrated by the Kotagala Pradeshiya Sabhawa.

See also
 Schools
List of towns in Central Province, Sri Lanka

External links

Populated places in Nuwara Eliya District